Françoise Olivier-Coupeau (3 July 1959 – 4 May 2011) was a member of the National Assembly of France.

Olivier-Coupeau was born in Laval, Mayenne.  She represented the Morbihan department (5th constituency),  and was a member of the Socialiste, radical, citoyen et divers gauche. She was a member of the National Defence and Armed Forces Committee.

References

1959 births
2011 deaths
Women members of the National Assembly (France)
21st-century French women politicians
20th-century French women politicians
Deputies of the 13th National Assembly of the French Fifth Republic